In epidemiology, preventable fraction for the population (PFp), is the proportion of incidents in the population that could be prevented by exposing the whole population.

It is used when an exposure reduces the risk, as opposed to increasing it, in which case its symmetrical notion is attributable fraction for the population.

See also 

 Population Impact Measures
 Preventable fraction among the unexposed

References 

Epidemiology
Medical statistics